Lyudmila Arkhipova (born 12 September 1978) is a female race walker from Russia.

Achievements

External links

1978 births
Living people
Russian female racewalkers
Place of birth missing (living people)
21st-century Russian athletes
21st-century Russian women